Roy Henry Drinkard (born July 12, 1920, in Falkville, Alabama) is an American businessman who owns numerous properties and shopping centers throughout the Southeastern United States. He currently resides in Cullman, Alabama, where he serves as president and CEO of Drinkard Development, Inc., a company which provides management, leasing and maintenance services for commercial properties.  He was named 2007 City Family Patriarch by the Committee of Cullman Farm-City.

Early life 
Drinkard's father was a business man and the mayor of Falkville for twenty years. Drinkard has five siblings, three brothers and two sisters. He attended St. Bernard Preparatory School in Cullman.

Drinkard served honorably in the US Marine Corps during World War II as a Private First Class. For a time, Drinkard ran a funeral home in Guntersville. In 1949, Drinkard returned to Cullman and became an autotrader. In April 2000, Roy H. Drinkard was appointed a trustee of Troy University in Troy, Alabama by then Alabama Governor Don Siegelman.

Many of the buildings owned by Drinkard are designed in German village-inspired themes, reflecting the German heritage and history of Cullman County, Alabama .

References 

American businesspeople in retailing
People from Morgan County, Alabama
1920 births
Living people
United States Marine Corps personnel of World War II
United States Marines